The Senegalese Women's Championship is the top flight of women's association football in Senegal. The competition is run by the Senegalese Football Federation.

History
The first Senegalese women's championship was contested in 1992.

Champions
The list of champions and runners-up:

Rq:
Sirènes de Grand Yoff (ex. Sirènes de la Patte d'Oie)

Most successful clubs

See also 
 Senegalese Women's Cup

References

External links 
 Tunisian Football Federation

Women's association football leagues in Africa
Football competitions in Senegal
Women
Sports leagues established in 1992
Women's football in Senegal